Shelden DeMar Williams (born October 21, 1983) is an American former professional basketball player. Nicknamed "The Landlord", he played college basketball for the Duke Blue Devils, and later played in the NBA for parts of seven seasons.

Williams earned the 2005 and 2006 NABC Defensive Player of the Year Awards while at Duke, becoming only the fifth player in history to earn the award two consecutive years. He holds Duke's career blocks record, single-season blocks record, and career rebounding record.

High school career
During high school, Williams was a member of the National Honor Society and the Fellowship of Christian Athletes. 
2002 EA Sports High School All-America selection
Gatorade Oklahoma Player of the Year: 2001, 2002
2001 USA Today Oklahoma Player of the Year
Oklahoma Player of the Year in 2001 by the Daily Oklahoman
Oklahoma Defensive Player of the Year: 2000, 2001
Ranked number 49 in the nation among all players by ESPN.com following his senior season (averaging 20 points, 12 rebounds, three blocked shots and three assists as a senior)
Rated the nation's fifth-best prep player by Future Stars and BlueChipHoops.com and sixth by College Basketball News entering the 2001–02 season
The Sporting News listed Williams as the nation's sixth-best prep player entering 2001–02
Rated the nation's number one forward by Basketball News and Prepstar
Three-time all-state, all-district and all-city selection (1999–2001)
2001 Parade All-America

College career
Williams played for the Duke University men's basketball team from 2002 to 2006. He majored in sociology with a markets and management studies certificate.

Williams became only the third Duke basketball player to record a triple-double when Duke defeated Maryland on January 11, 2006, recording 19 points, 11 rebounds and 10 blocks.

On January 28, 2007, Duke retired Williams' No. 23 jersey.

Williams is the third player in ACC history to have 1,500 points, 1,000 rebounds, 350 blocks and 150 steals (joining Tim Duncan and Ralph Sampson). His 1,217 rebounds and 1,859 career points rank him seventh in ACC history and sixteenth in Duke history, respectively.

Records
As of graduating from Duke University, Williams held records for:
Duke all-time leader in blocked shots (422)
Duke all-time leader in rebounds
Duke single season blocked shots

Awards
 National Association of Basketball Coaches Defensive Player of the Year: 2005, 2006
 Associated Press First Team All American: 2006
 John R. Wooden First Team All American: 2006
Senior CLASS All-Senior All American Team: 2006
John R. Wooden National Player of the Year Finalist: 2006
NBA Rookie of the Month: April 2007

Professional career

Atlanta Hawks (2006–2008)
Williams was selected by the Atlanta Hawks with the fifth overall pick in the 2006 NBA draft. On July 10, 2006, he signed his rookie scale contract with the Hawks. On November 1, Williams made his NBA debut, recording three rebounds and one block in a 75–88 loss to the Philadelphia 76ers. On April 16, 2007, he logged a season-high 17 rebounds, alongside 16 points, in a 96–102 loss to the Milwaukee Bucks. A day later, he scored a season-high 21 points, alongside ten rebounds, in a 118–102 win over the Indiana Pacers. Williams was named the NBA Eastern Conference Rookie of the Month for games played in April.

Sacramento Kings (2008–2009)
On February 16, 2008, Williams was traded, alongside Anthony Johnson, Tyronn Lue, Lorenzen Wright and a 2008 second-round pick, to the Sacramento Kings in exchange for Mike Bibby. On April 15, Williams logged a season-high 11 rebounds, alongside 12 points and three steals, in a 101–124 loss to the Los Angeles Lakers.

Minnesota Timberwolves (2009)
On February 19, 2009, Williams was traded, alongside Bobby Brown, to the Minnesota Timberwolves in exchange for Rashad McCants and Calvin Booth.

Boston Celtics (2009–2010)
On August 7, 2009, Williams signed a one-year contract with the Boston Celtics.

Denver Nuggets (2010–2011)
On July 14, 2010, Williams signed a one-year contract with the Denver Nuggets.

New York Knicks (2011)
On February 22, 2011, Williams was traded to the New York Knicks in a three-way blockbuster deal also involving Minnesota Timberwolves that brought Carmelo Anthony to New York.

New Jersey Nets (2011–2012)
On December 13, 2011, Williams signed with the New Jersey Nets.

Élan Chalon (2012–2013)
On August 28, 2012, Williams signed a one-year contract with the French League champions Élan Chalon. Over 10 games in the 2012–13 Euroleague season, he averaged 11.3 points and 7.6 rebounds per game.

Tianjin Ronggang (2013–2015)
In October 2013, Williams signed with Tianjin Ronggang of China.

Career statistics

NBA

Regular season

|-
| align="left" | 
| align="left" | Atlanta
| 81 || 31 || 18.7 || .455 || .500 || .764 || 5.4 || .5 || .6 || .5 || 5.5
|-
| align="left" | 
| align="left" | Atlanta
| 36 || 0 || 11.5 || .370 || .000 || .686 || 3.0 || .3 || .4 || .4 || 3.0
|-
| align="left" | 
| align="left" | Sacramento
| 28 || 0 || 12.9 || .491 || .000 || .667 || 3.5 || .3 || .3 || .4 || 5.2
|-
| align="left" | 
| align="left" | Sacramento
| 30 || 0 || 10.2 || .449 || .000 || .762 || 2.6 || .3 || .4 || .3 ||.7
|-
| align="left" | 
| align="left" | Minnesota
| 15 || 0 || 13.8 || .441 || .000 || .667 || 5.0 || .3 || .7 || .5 || 4.9
|-
| align="left" | 
| align="left" | Boston
| 54 || 0 || 11.1 || .521 || .000 || .765 || 2.7 || .4 || .2 || .4 || 3.7
|-
| align="left" | 
| align="left" | Denver
| 42 || 32 || 17.0 || .453 || .000 || .739 || 5.3 || .5 || .4 || .5 || 4.7
|-
| align="left" | 
| align="left" | New York
| 17 || 6 || 11.6 || .538 || .000 || .828 || 2.9 || .8 || .3 || .2 || 3.9
|-
| align="left" | 
| align="left" | New Jersey
| 58 || 35 || 22.0 || .478 || .000 || .731 || 6.0 || .6 || .8 || .7 || 4.6
|- class="sortbottom"
| align="left" | Career
| align="left" |
| 361 || 104 || 15.5 || .462 || .222 || .740 || 4.3 || .5 || .5 || .5 || 4.5

Playoffs

|-
| align="left" | 2010
| align="left" | Boston
| 8 || 0 || 7.1 || .444 || .000 || .833 || 1.6 || .0 || .1 || .0 || 1.6

Euroleague

|-
| align="left" | 2012–13
| align="left" | Élan Chalon
| 10 || 10 || 23.0 || .518 || .000 || .641 || 7.6 || 1.1 || 1.1 || .7 || 11.3 || 14.8

Personal life
On November 13, 2008, Williams married former University of Tennessee Lady Vols and current Las Vegas Aces basketball star Candace Parker. They have a daughter named Lailaa.  In November 2016, Williams filed for divorce claiming irreconcilable differences. They had been living separately for 3 months prior to the divorce. They share joint custody with neither paying child support to the other.

Shelden started the Shelden Williams Foundation in 2019. The Shelden Williams Foundation is dedicated to empowering student athletes and their families by delivering and supporting initiatives that promote emotional and physical health through sports, education, and community involvement. For more info on the Shelden Williams Foundation, go to the website to see the latest events https://sheldenwilliamsfoundation.com/

See also

 List of NCAA Division I men's basketball career blocks leaders

References

External links

 SheldenWilliams.com Shelden's Official Website
 
 
 Euroleague.net Profile
 Shelden Williams has spent the last four years at Duke coming out of his shell – ESPN The Magazine

 

1983 births
Living people
African-American basketball players
All-American college men's basketball players
American expatriate basketball people in China
American expatriate basketball people in France
American men's basketball players
Atlanta Hawks draft picks
Atlanta Hawks players
Basketball coaches from Oklahoma
Basketball players from Oklahoma
Boston Celtics players
Centers (basketball)
College Park Skyhawks coaches
Denver Nuggets players
Duke Blue Devils men's basketball players
Élan Chalon players
Erie BayHawks (2017–2019) coaches
Minnesota Timberwolves players
New Jersey Nets players
New York Knicks players
Parade High School All-Americans (boys' basketball)
People from Midwest City, Oklahoma
Power forwards (basketball)
Sacramento Kings players
Sportspeople from Oklahoma County, Oklahoma
Tianjin Pioneers players
Universiade gold medalists for the United States
Universiade medalists in basketball
Medalists at the 2005 Summer Universiade
21st-century African-American sportspeople
20th-century African-American people